The 2000 IIHF InLine Hockey World Championship was the fourth IIHF InLine Hockey World Championship, the premier annual international inline hockey tournament. It took place in Hradec Králové and Choceň, Czech Republic, with the gold-medal game played on July 15, 2000.

Qualification

Group I
Played in Landvetter, Sweden

Scores

Standings

Group II
Played in Kapfenberg, Austria

Scores

Standings

Italy later withdrew from the World Championship, and was replaced by Hungary.

Group III
Played in Choceñ, Czech Republic

Scores

Standings

Originally, Ukraine was supposed to compete as well.

Southern Hemisphere Group
Played in Buenos Aires, Argentina

Scores

Standings

Namibia was originally supposed to take part in the tournament. Chile eventually qualified for the World Championship, replacing Canada (who withdrew due to lack of funding for the trip)

Asia-Oceania Group
Played in Melbourne, Australia

Scores

Standings

Originally, Japan was supposed to compete as well.

Championship

Preliminary round
Group A standings

Group B standings

Playoff round

Placement games
13th place game

11th place game

9th place game

7th place game

5th place game

Semifinals

Bronze medal game

Gold medal game

References

IIHF InLine Hockey World Championship
2000 in inline hockey